Inape polysparta is a species of moth of the family Tortricidae. It is endemic to Ecuador (Napo Province).

References

External links

Moths described in 2006
Endemic fauna of Ecuador
Moths of South America
polysparta
Taxa named by Józef Razowski